Werner Friedrich Dissel (26 August 1912 – 22 January 2003) was a German actor, director, and resistance fighter against the Nazi regime.

Biography
Dissel's began working as a newspaper photographer in the late 1920s. After the Nazis' rise to power, he became a member of an antifascist group headed by Harro Schulze-Boysen, and was involved in the resistance newspaper Wille zum Reich. Dissel was caught and imprisoned from 1937 to 1939. During his time in prison, the Gestapo arranged for Boysen to visit him, in the hope that something incriminating would be said while the two would be left alone in a tapped room; Boysen passed a cigarette pack to Dissel, on which he wrote that the police had no concrete evidence against him. After his release, Boysen convinced him to volunteer into the Wehrmacht, so he could "destroy Hitler's army from within". Dissel joined the armed forces shortly before the German Invasion of Poland, and served in a military meteorology unit. At 1942, he barely avoided an arrest during the Gestapo's crackdown on the Red Orchestra.

After the war, he openly joined the KPD and decided to pursue his old dream to become an actor. Dissel joined a cabaret in Wiesbaden, and in 1950 emigrated to East Germany. There he appeared in numerous plays, TV shows and movies. He worked with the Berliner Ensemble, DEFA and DFF. He continued his acting career after the reunification. In total, he appeared in more than a hundred film and television productions.

He received the Art Prize of the German Democratic Republic at a collective awarding in October 1986.

Selected filmography

1954: Ernst Thälmann
1956: Die Millionen der Yvette - Zeitungsverkäufer
1956: Der Hauptmann von Köln
1958: Les Misérables - Brevet
1958: Ein Mädchen von 16 ½ - Rohn
1959: Goods For Catalonia - Portier
1959: Bevor der Blitz einschlägt - Sylvio O. Schmitt - Kunstkritiker
1959: Love's Confusion - 2. Taxichauffeur
1959: The Goodies
1960: The Opportunists - Fario
1961: Die Liebe und der Co-Pilot - Meteorologe
1961: Der Fremde
1961: The Gleiwitz Case - Volksschullehrer
1961: Ärzte
1962: Rotkäppchen - Wolf
1963: Naked among Wolves - Otto Lange
1963: Jetzt und in der Stunde meines Todes - Herr Merker
1964: Die Maskierten - Sheriff McElliott
1964: Pension Boulanka - Dr. Vollmer
1965: Solange Leben in mir ist - Bethmann-Hollweg
1965: Denk bloß nicht, ich heule - Mantek
1966: Schwarze Panther
1966: Zejscie do piekla - Rudolf Knoll
1967: Geschichten jener Nacht - Kilian (segment "Materna")
1968: Heroin - Zollrat Donkenberg
1971: Liberation III: Direction of the Main Blow - Alfred Jodl
1974: Ulzana - Mexikanischer Arzt
1974: Johannes Kepler - Richter
1975: Am Ende der Welt - Amtsdiener Göpel
1975: Till Eulenspiegel - Scholastischer Professor
1976: Mann gegen Mann - Angler
1976: Beethoven - Tage aus einem Leben - Grisslinger
1978: Rotschlipse
1980: Levins Mühle - Plontke
1980: Johann Sebastian Bachs vergebliche Reise in den Ruhm - Vater Nichelmann
1984: Kaskade rückwärts - Gast
1986: Der Traum vom Elch - Paulchen
1987: Stielke, Heinz, fünfzehn... - Invalide
1987: Kindheit - Lehrer
1988: Fallada: The Last Chapter - Doktor
1989: Coming Out - Older homosexual man
1989: Der Magdalenenbaum - Opa Panse
1990: Die Architekten - Alter
1990: Grönland - Professor Kah
1991:  - Merz
1992:  - Notar
1992: 
1992: Verlorene Landschaft
1992: 
1992: Der Besucher - Blind man
1994: Heller Tag
2000: Anatomy - Paula's Grandfather

References

1912 births
2003 deaths
German male film actors
German male stage actors
German male television actors
German resistance members
Communists in the German Resistance
German Army personnel of World War II
Red Orchestra (espionage)
Recipients of the Art Prize of the German Democratic Republic